Janice Whaley is an American a cappella singer and songwriter from California.

Discography

Albums
 The Smiths Project (2011), album series and box set including:
 The Smiths
 Hatful of Hollow
 Meat is Murder
 The Queen is Dead
 Louder than Bombs
 Strangeways, Here We Come
 Patchwork Life (2012)

Stand-alone cover versions and collaborations
 "Trees" (2011): re-recording of track from the Curt Smith (Tears For Fears) album Mayfield.
 "Ideas as Opiates" (2012): duet with actor James Roday, original version by Tears For Fears.
 "We Need You" (2012): cover version of Duran Duran original, as requested by Simon Le Bon.

References

External links
 JaniceWhaley.com
 TheSmithsProject.com

Year of birth missing (living people)
Living people
American women singers
San Francisco State University alumni
21st-century American women